Madeleine Bemelmans (née Freund; June 6, 1911 in New York City – 2004) was an animal welfare activist and the wife of Ludwig Bemelmans, who wrote and illustrated the Madeline series of children's picture book series. The two were married in 1935 and Ludwig named the star of his books after his wife. (The change in spelling fostered frequent misspelling of his wife's name.)

Madeleine Bemelmans was a dedicated participant in founding the Animal Welfare Institute in 1951. She served as a long-time board member of the Society for Animal Protective Legislation and as the president of that organization for a time. 

Bemelmans died in 2004.

Madeleine Bemelmans edited a collection of her husband's work published by Viking in 1985, Tell Them It Was Wonderful: Selected Writings.

Madeleine and Barbara Bemelmans are credited for three Ravensburger jigsaw puzzles for very young children —Madeline (1991) and Madeline at the street fair (1995), Madeline dress-up (1997)— and one board game, Madeline's house (1995).

References

External links
 Obituary for Madeleine Bemelmans from AWI Quarterly at the Animal Welfare Institute
 Ludwig Bemelmans Biography at the Penguin Group
 "Madeleine Freund" in The Name's Familiar by Laura Lee
 Madeleine Bemelmans at Library of Congress Authorities — with 2 catalog records

1911 births
2004 deaths
American animal welfare workers
Madeline
People from New York City